The Minister for Foreign Trade and Development Cooperation is a Minister without Portfolio in the Netherlands. The officeholder, who is a member of the Cabinet and the Council of Ministers, is assigned to the Ministry of Foreign Affairs. The Minister is tasked with Trade and Export, Development Cooperation and International Environmental Policies. The current Minister is Liesje Schreinemacher of the People's Party for Freedom and Democracy (VVD) who has been in office since 10 January 2021.

Until 2012, the title was Minister for Development Cooperation (minister voor Ontwikkelingssamenwerking). Foreign trade and export promotion were handled by another appointee, a State Secretary at the Ministry of Economic Affairs. Internationally, the State Secretary was allowed to use the title of Minister on official business. In 2010 both posts were merged, first as a State Secretary; two years later a ministership was reinstated.

List of Ministers for Development Cooperation

List of State Secretaries

See also
 Ministry of Foreign Affairs
 Minister of Foreign Affairs
 Netherlands Foreign Investment Agency
 Center for the Promotion of Imports
 Netherlands Environmental Assessment Agency
 NICCT
 List of the largest trading partners of the Netherlands
 Development aid

References

Development Cooperation
 
Netherlands
Netherlands
Netherlands
Netherlands
Netherlands